Frankford and Delaware Avenue station, also known as the Northern Liberties Loop, is a SEPTA Route 15 trolley station in Philadelphia, United States, located in the Port Richmond neighborhood.  The station serves the area surrounding Rivers Casino Philadelphia.

Gallery

External links
SEPTA Route 15

Railway stations in Philadelphia
Railway stations in the United States opened in 1955
SEPTA Route 15 stations
1955 establishments in Pennsylvania